Penske Corporation is an American conglomerate operating in the automotive services industry.

Penske may also refer to:
Penske Media Corporation, an independent digital media and publishing company, based in Los Angeles, California

People
Roger Penske (born 1937), American businessman and retired professional auto racing driver, owner of Penske Corporation
Jay Penske, chairman and CEO of Penske Media Corporation, and son of Roger Penske